Joseph Suttle House, also known as Twin Chimneys, is a historic home located near Shelby, Cleveland County, North Carolina.  It was built between 1820 and 1847, and is a two-story, three bay, gable-roofed frame dwelling with Federal style design elements. It features two stuccoed, smooth shouldered exterior chimneys. Also on the property are a contributing smokehouse and family cemetery.

It was listed on the National Register of Historic Places in 1980.

References

Houses on the National Register of Historic Places in North Carolina
Federal architecture in North Carolina
Houses completed in 1847
Houses in Cleveland County, North Carolina
National Register of Historic Places in Cleveland County, North Carolina
1847 establishments in North Carolina